The Lambeth Building Society was a UK building society. It was founded in February 1852 as The Number Three Borough of Lambeth Permanent Benefit Building Society.

It merged with the Portman Building Society in 2006. At the time of the merger, the Lambeth was the 20th largest building society in the UK, with assets of £1 billion.  It was based in the south of London, with 9 branches and approximately 130 employees.

Following Portman's merger with Nationwide Building Society, branches now bear the Nationwide name.

References

Banks established in 1852
Organizations established in 1852
1852 establishments in England